Gymnopilus magnificus is a species of mushroom in the family Hymenogastraceae. It was described as new to science in 1986 by Mexican mycologists Gastón Guzmán and Laura Guzmán Dávalos.

See also

List of Gymnopilus species

References

magnificus
Fungi described in 1986
Fungi of North America